Shanxi University of Finance and Economics (abbr. as SXUFE) ), founded in 1951, is one of the earliest financial universities in China. The university sticks to highlighting the academic characteristics and advantages of Economics and Management, focusing on Economics, Management and Laws as the mainstay subjects and developing interdependently Economics, Management, Laws, Literal Arts, Science, Engineering and Teaching.

History
Shanxi University of Finance and Economics was founded in 1951, which is one of the forerunners in the field of higher education of finance and economics in China. In September 1958, the five cadres schools were merged to form the Shanxi Finance and Economics Institute (SXFEI). Shanxi Economic Management Institute (SXEMI) was founded in 1984. In October 1997, with the approval of the former China State Educational Committee, SXFEI and SXEMI were merged composing SXUFE, which was under the control of the Shanxi Province and Ministry of Education. Since 2000, SXUFE has been shifted to mainly administrate by Shanxi Province.

Rankings
SXUFEs comprehensive ability in running a university is improving steadily. It has entered the list of the top 100 universities of social sciences and ranks 11th among all the universities of finance and economics in China. In the aspect of scientific innovation and competitiveness, SXUFE is in the list of the top 100 universities of social sciences.

Academics
Research of all kinds at SXUFE is increasing in quantity, quality, and diversity. Of all the research, 13 are of state level; 275 of provincial or ministerial level; and 31 are horizontal subjects. About 1,496 papers were published in key journals, among which 278 were published in state journals; 12 entered the five major paper indexing system; 64 received provincial or ministerial awards.

In 2005, SXUFE received two nationally funded projects in natural sciences and three in social sciences and 22 research projects received Shanxi Excellent Research Award. SXUFE was approved to carry out 25 research subjects in the validation of 2005 research subjects in "the tenth Five" plan for Shanxi philosophy and social sciences. For this approval, SXUFE continues to rank first of all the applying institutions.

Students 
There are more than 22,000 students are registered at SXUFE, including 17,000 full-time undergraduate students and 3,500 graduates and PhD candidates. The others are adult students from the schools of Continuing Education and Online Education.

Alumni 

 Bao Kexin, '78-'79, CEO of China Grain Reserves Corporation
 Cai Esheng, '82 Vice-Chairman of China Banking Regulatory Commission
 Feng Shuping, '78 Vice-Director of Budget Committee of the Standing Committee of the National People's Congress
 Ma Xulun, '84 Executive Director, CEO of China Eastern Airlines 
 Feng Hongping, Vice-Chairman at Morgan Stanley China
 Lan Yisheng, Professor of Shanghai University of Finance and Economics
 Mai Tianshu, '82 Author and Writer
 Pan Hongliang, Vice-President of China Grain Reserves Corporation.
 Sun Baohou, '81 Auditor-in-Chief of National Audit Office of the People's Republic of China
 Wang Liyan, '82 Professor of Guanghua School of Management at Peking University
 Yuan Bing, Vice-President of TCL Group
 Yuan Hongqi, Professor of Shanghai University of Finance and Economics
 Zhang Hongli, Executive Vice President and COO of China Investment Corporation

External links
English homepage of Shanxi University of Finance and Economics

Universities and colleges in Shanxi
Educational institutions established in 1951
Business schools in China
1951 establishments in China